David Ellis (born 2 January 1951) is an Australian cricketer. He played in one first-class and one List A match for Queensland in 1973/74.

See also
 List of Queensland first-class cricketers

References

External links
 

1951 births
Living people
Australian cricketers
Queensland cricketers
Cricketers from Brisbane